Fulfillment house and fulfillment center (in British English: fulfilment house and fulfilment centre) are modern terms for a packing warehouse. The terms were coined in the middle of the 1990s, and "fulfillment center" is usually used about an in-house packing warehouse, while "fulfillment house" tends to be used about companies that specialize in warehousing and packing for others.

Origin of term 
The usage of the word "'fulfillment" in relation to goods shipments comes from the terms "order fulfillment" and "product fulfillment", which were introduced by business management researchers who analysed supply chains in the late 1980s. This was soon picked up by PR people working for picking warehouse companies, who felt that "fulfillment centre" or "fulfillment house" sounded more positive and active than the old term "warehouse". The terms are still so new and unknown by people outside that industry that "warehouse" often is added in parenthesis or used as an alternative word in the same text, in order to explain to laymen what "fulfillment centre" or "fulfillment house" actually means.

External or internal
Some companies, such as Amazon, have their own fulfillment centers, while many smaller e-commerce companies outsource their warehousing, picking, packaging and shipping to external fulfillment companies. These external fulfillment companies are known as third-party logistic providers. Many larger companies with their own fulfillment centers also handle warehousing and shipping for other sellers. Amazon itself is one such example, offering to handle warehousing and order fulfillment to third-party sellers. Another, very early, example was Fingerhut, which in the 1990s expanded its own fulfillment center in order to take on fulfillment services for other companies, including the company that eventually acquired Fingerhut: Federated Department Stores.

Types
There are multiple types of fulfillment houses. In the past, a fulfillment center was typically associated with filling larger commercial orders to a retailer or distributor. Today, with the growth of ecommerce, there are fulfillment centers that strictly focus on shipping small parcels direct-to-consumers (DTC). Additionally, some ecommerce fulfillment centers focus on a niche, such as small or large products, a specific type of product (for example - apparel), or they only with a certain number of stock keeping units (SKUs).

A subset of ecommerce known as drop shipping, a type of product fulfillment that occurs directly from manufacturers to consumers via 3rd party retail websites, utilizes the manufacturer's or a wholesaler's fulfillment centers to deliver goods to the customer. In drop shipping, the company that generates the sale never handles the physical product, but it does pass on fulfillment requirements to the fulfillment house so that customer demands like two-day shipping can be met.

Fulfillment House Due Diligence Scheme
The UK government believes that fulfillment houses are in a position to facilitate non-payment of VAT on goods imported into the UK. The government argues that this type of abuse is "enabled by misdeclaration and undervaluation of goods imported from outside the EU, and sometimes the abuse of reliefs that are designed to facilitate trade. This is followed by the onward sale of the goods to customers in the UK taking place without the correct amounts of UK VAT being paid" and believes that registering fulfillment houses and requiring due diligence and record-keeping is "part of the solution".

Provision for this "Fulfillment House Due Diligence Scheme" is included in sections 48 to 59 of the Finance Bill 2017, introduced into the UK Parliament in September 2017.

References

Warehouses